Margaret Ball (1515–1584) was an Irish Catholic martyr.

Margaret Ball may also refer to:

Margaret Ball (writer) (born 1947), American writer
M. Margaret Ball, on List of Guggenheim Fellowships awarded in 1949